Ikaji Salum (born 15 February 1967) is a retired Tanzanian long-distance runner.

He participated in 3000 metres steeplechase at the 1988 Summer Olympics. In the marathon he finished sixteenth at the 1995 World Championships and participated at the 1996 Summer Olympics.

Achievements

External links

Full Olympians
sports-reference

1967 births
Living people
Tanzanian steeplechase runners
Tanzanian male marathon runners
Athletes (track and field) at the 1988 Summer Olympics
Athletes (track and field) at the 1996 Summer Olympics
Olympic athletes of Tanzania
Male steeplechase runners